Dress to Kill is the third studio album by American hardcore punk band 2Cents. It was released on December 1, 2009, through Eight O Five Records.

Track listing

Personnel

 Adam O’Rourke – lead vocals, drums
Dave O’Rourke – guitar, vocals
Jason Wendell – bass
Adair Cobley – guitar

2009 albums
2Cents albums